Horace Thompson (1900 – after 1922) was an English footballer born in Birmingham who played in the Football League for Birmingham F.C. The only game he played for the club was on 3 February 1923, in a 2–0 defeat away at Oldham Athletic in the First Division, an appearance which is often attributed to Len Thompson.

References

1900 births
Year of death missing
Footballers from Birmingham, West Midlands
English footballers
Association football wingers
Birmingham City F.C. players
English Football League players
Date of birth missing
Place of death missing